In mathematics and theoretical physics, the induced metric is the metric tensor defined on a submanifold that is induced from the metric tensor on a manifold into which the submanifold is embedded, through the pullback. It may be determined using the following formula (using the Einstein summation convention), which is the component form of the pullback operation:

Here ,  describe the indices of coordinates  of the submanifold while the functions  encode the embedding into the higher-dimensional manifold whose tangent indices are denoted , .

Example – curve on a torus

Let
 

be a map from the domain of the curve   with parameter  into the Euclidean manifold . Here  are constants.

.

and we compute

Therefore

See also
First fundamental form

References

Differential geometry